Pascal Itter (born 3 April 1995) is a German professional footballer who plays as a right-back for Rot Weiss Ahlen.

Career
Itter has played for 1. FC Nürnberg, FC Schalke 04, SV Grödig, SC Paderborn and Chemnitzer FC.

Honours
Individual
 Fritz Walter Medal U17 Bronze: 2012

References

External links
 
 

1995 births
Living people
German footballers
Association football fullbacks
1. FC Nürnberg players
FC Schalke 04 players
SV Grödig players
SC Paderborn 07 players
Chemnitzer FC players
SC Fortuna Köln players
Rot Weiss Ahlen players
3. Liga players
Regionalliga players
Austrian Football Bundesliga players
German expatriate footballers
German expatriate sportspeople in Austria
Expatriate footballers in Austria
People from Schwalmstadt
Sportspeople from Kassel (region)
Footballers from Hesse